Eduard Halustovych Halstyan (born 1 October 1998) is a Ukrainian professional footballer who plays as a defender for Chernihiv in the Ukrainian First League.

Player career
In 2015, he started his career at SDYuShOR Desna and then moved to Desna-2 Chernihiv, the youth academy and reserve squad of Desna Chernihiv. In 2015 he moved to the youth ranks of FC Chernihiv and then to LKT Chernigiv. In 2016 he moved back to Desna-2 Chernihiv for two seasons before returning to FC Chernihiv's youth ranks and back again to Desna-2 Chernihiv.

Chernihiv
On 26 August 2022 he signed for FC Chernihiv in the Ukrainian First League. On 10 October, he made his debut against Poltava at the Lokomotyv Stadium in Poltava, replacing Mykola Syrash at the 86th minutes.

Personal life
In addition to Ukrainian citizenship, Halstyan also holds Armenian citizenship.

Career statistics

Club

References

External links
 Eduard Halstyan at FC Chernihiv 
 
 Eduard Halstyan at upl.ua 
 Eduard Halstyan at pfl.ua 

1998 births
Living people
Footballers from Chernihiv
SDYuShOR Desna players
FC Desna-2 Chernihiv players
FC Desna Chernihiv players
FC Chernihiv players
Ukrainian footballers
Association football central defenders
Ukrainian First League players